An election to Kildare County Council took place on 23 May 2014 as part of that year's Irish local elections. 40 councillors were elected from five electoral divisions by PR-STV voting for a five-year term of office, an increase in 15 seats compared to 2009. In addition Athy Town Council, Leixlip Town Council, Naas Town Council and Newbridge Town Council were all abolished.

In recognition of its major population growth in recent times Kildare was allocated 15 additional council seats. This helped to insulate both Government parties somewhat from anti-Government hostility that lead to seat losses in other counties. Fine Gael returned 9 seats, as they did in 2009 and Labour returned with 5 councillors, a loss of 1 seat in the Kildare-Newbridge LEA. Fianna Fáil emerged as the big winners doubling their seats to 12 and becoming the largest party. The party won 3 seats in each of Kildare-Newbridge, Maynooth and in Naas. Sinn Féin won a seat in each LEA, returning to County Hall for the first time since 1999. Independents also gained 5 seats to have a total membership of 9.

Results by party

Results by Electoral Area

Athy

Celbridge-Leixlip

Kildare-Newbridge

Maynooth

Naas

References

Post-Election Changes
†On 16 October 2014 Athy Fianna Fáil Councillor Mark Dalton resigned from the party and became an Independent after financial irregularities were discovered at a voluntary housing association of which he was a director.  He resigned from the Council in September 2018 and Fianna Fáil's Brian Dooley was co-opted to fill the vacancy on 20 November 2018.
††On 30 November 2014 Naas Fianna Fáil Councillor Willie Callaghan died after a short illness. On 26 January 2015 his daughter, Deborah, was co-opted to fill the vacancy. 
†††On 19 December 2015 Kildare-Newbridge Independent Councillor Willie Crowley died after injuries sustained from a hit and run incident. Independent Morgan McCabe was co-opted to fill the vacancy on 26 January 2016.†††
††††Naas Fianna Fáil Councillor James Lawless was elected as a TD for Kildare North at the Irish general election, 2016. Carmel Kelly was co-opted to fill the vacancy on 14 March 2016.
†††††Celbridge-Leixlip Fianna Fáil Councillor Frank O'Rourke was elected as a TD for Kildare North at the Irish general election, 2016. Michael Coleman was co-opted to fill the vacancy on 14 March 2016.
††††††Kildare-Newbridge Fianna Fáil Councillor Fiona O'Loughlin was elected as a TD for Kildare South at the Irish general election, 2016. Murty Aspell was co-opted to fill the vacancy on 14 March 2016.
†††††††Naas Sinn Féin Councillor Sorcha O'Neill resigned from the party and became an Independent on 21 April 2017 citing allegations of bullying, intimidation and a toxic and hostile environment.7 SF members in Naas quit party
††††††††Kildare-Newbridge Fine Gael Councillor Fiona McLoughlin-Healy resigned from the party and became an Independent on 9 March 2018 citing failure by the party to address in a meaningful way a formal complaint she had made.
†††††††††Celbridge-Leixlip Sinn Féin Councillor Ide Cussen resigned from the party on 21 November 2018 saying there was no freedom of conscience in the party on the abortion issue. She then announced she was joining the new party being created by Peadar Tóibín.

External links
 Official website

2014 Irish local elections
2014